Bjørnar Ustad Kristensen (born 26 January 1982 in Stavanger) is a Norwegian track and field athlete who mainly competes in the 3000 metres steeplechase. He represented the club Sandnes IL.

International competitions

References

1982 births
Living people
Sportspeople from Stavanger
Norwegian male long-distance runners
Norwegian male steeplechase runners
World Athletics Championships athletes for Norway